The Punjab Education Foundation is an autonomous, statutory body of the Punjab Government which works under the auspicious guidance of its 15-member board of directors (BOD) which is headed by the Chairman selected among the private members.

History
The Punjab Education Foundation (PEF) was established in 1991 through an act of Provincial Assembly of the Punjab. In 2004, PEF was restructured and Dr. Allah Bakhsh Malik, UNESCO Confucius Laureate was appointed as its first MD/CEO (2005-2008). The first Board of Directors consisted of Mr. Shahid Hafeez Kardar former Governor State Bank of Pakistan, Group Captain Cecil Chaudhry, national hero, Ms. Shaista Pervez Malik and Mr. Khalid Ikhlaq Gilani PAS, Secretary School Education Department. Dr. Malik developed the vision of the restructured foundation. "To promote quality education through Public Private Partnership (PPP), encourage and support the efforts of private sector through technical and financial assistance and innovate and develop new instruments to champion wider educational opportunities at affordable cost to the poor." The Vision, mission and objectives of the Foundation were approved by the BOD. PEF introduced wonderful initiatives like FAS, EVS, TICSS and CPD and was supported by Chaudhry Pervez Ellahi as Chief Minister and Mr. Salman Siddiq Chief Secretary Punjab. The Chairman was elected by the members of the Board from private sector and CEO was appointed by BOD after proper selection process and advertisement in newspapers. The Foundation has taken many initiatives for the promotion of affordable quality education for less privileged and disenfranchised sections of society and has introduced new cost effective, economical and affordable models in Public Private Partnership. The initiatives have been widely appreciated and recognized at national and international level as well. Currently, more than 2.6 million students are getting free and quality education in 7,468 partner schools across the Punjab. 

The foundation is running three kinds of schools under "Foundation Assisted School (FAS)", "Education Voucher Scheme (EVS)" and "New School Programme (NSP)" programmes. It also trains the teachers of its partner schools under Continuous Development Programme(CPDP).

To check quality education it has a comprehensive examination system under Academic Development Unit (ADU). The partner schools have to show 75% results lest they would fail.

The Foundation has taken many innovative interventions for promotion of affordable quality school education for the less-privileged and disenfranchised sections of the society and has introduced new cost-effective, economical and affordable models through Public Private Partnership. These initiatives have been widely appreciated and recognized at national and international level by now. PEF provides financial assistance on monthly basis to partner schools on per child enrolment basis @ rate of Rs.550/- for primary level, Rs. 600/- for elementary level, Rs. 900/- for Secondary (Arts), Rs.1100/- for Secondary (Science), Rs. 1200/- for Higher Secondary (Arts) and Rs. 1500/- for Higher Secondary (Science).

Lahore University of Management Sciences - LUMS published a book, ' Candles in the Dark' and wrote a chapter on PEF. The Economist highlighted the achievements of PEF.

Functions 

Foundation Assisted School (FAS)
Education Voucher Scheme (EVS)
New School Program (NSP)
Continuous Professional Development Program (CPDP)
Academic Development Unit (ADU)
Monitoring and Evaluation (M&E)

See also
 School education department (Punjab, Pakistan)

External links 
PEF official website

Education in Punjab, Pakistan